William Lowell Sr. (1863 – June 24, 1954) was a dentist and an inventor of a wooden golf tee.

Biography
William Lowell was born in Hoboken, New Jersey and lived in Maplewood, New Jersey and had a son, William Lowell Jr. (1897–1976). He first made 5,000 tees, that were stained green, but he soon changed to red, to make them more distinctive and named them "Reddy Tees". In 1922 Walter Hagen and Joe Kirkwood Sr. used his tees during their exhibitions. The Reddy Tee was patented on May 13, 1925, but in 1922 he signed a deal with the A.G. Spalding Company, for 24 dozen. By 1925 he was selling $100,000 worth of tees and they were being made of celluloid. By 1926 copycat versions were on the market, and he spent much of his time and money fighting patent infringement.

He died at Orange Memorial Hospital in East Orange, New Jersey on June 24, 1954 at the age of 91.

Patents
 golf tee filed December 7, 1925
 golf tee filed August 26, 1925
 gold putter filed November 13, 1925

See also
George Franklin Grant, another golf tee inventor

References

External links

Golf equipment manufacturers
People from East Orange, New Jersey
People from Hoboken, New Jersey
People from Maplewood, New Jersey
People from South Orange, New Jersey
People from Summit, New Jersey
1863 births
1954 deaths